Salweenia is a genus of flowering plants in the family Fabaceae. It belongs to the subfamily Faboideae.

Species
Salweenia comprises the following species:
 Salweenia bouffordiana H.Sun, Zhi M.Li & J.P.Yue
 Salweenia wardii Baker f.

References

Sophoreae
Fabaceae genera